Villopotamon is a genus of freshwater crabs, recorded from Thailand and Vietnam.  Data are deficient concerning their IUCN Red List of Threatened Species status.

Species
 Villopotamon klossianum (Kemp, 1923)
 Villopotamon sphaeridium (Kemp, 1923)
 Villopotamon thaii Dang & Hô, 2003

References

External links

Potamoidea
Freshwater crustaceans of Asia